John Raymond Fronek (May 11, 1883 – September 4, 1969) was an American farmer and politician.

Born in the Austro-Hungarian Empire, Fronek moved with his parents to Coal City, Illinois and worked as a coal miner. In 1900, he settled on a dairy farm in Ackley, Wisconsin, in Langlade County, Wisconsin. Fronek was involved with the farm, cheese production, and dairy cooperatives. He served on the Longfellow School Board, town supervisor, and town assessor. From 1927 to 1933, Fronek served in the Wisconsin State Assembly as a Progressive and a Republican. He died in Antigo, Wisconsin in 1969.

Notes

1883 births
1969 deaths
People from Langlade County, Wisconsin
Austro-Hungarian emigrants to the United States
Farmers from Wisconsin
Wisconsin Progressives (1924)
Wisconsin city council members
School board members in Wisconsin
Republican Party members of the Wisconsin State Assembly
20th-century American politicians
People from Coal City, Illinois